Bruce Jacobs may refer to:

 Bruce Jacobs (radio host) (born 1964), American sports talk radio show host
 Bruce Jacobs (field hockey) (born 1975), South African field hockey player
 J. Bruce Jacobs (1943–2019), American-born Australian academic

See also
Bruce Jacob (born 1935), American attorney